The first season of Legendary aired in 2020.

Contestants

House progress 

Table Key
 The house won Legendary
 The house was the runner-up
 The house won the ball and was declared the superior house of the episode
 The house won one of the categories of the episode or received positive critiques from the judges and was declared safe
 The house received critiques from the judges and was declared safe
 The house received negative critiques on their performance but was declared safe
 The house was in the bottom two
 The house was eliminated
 The house did not battle and was eliminated

Vogue redemption battles

Episodes

2020 American television seasons
2020 in LGBT history
Legendary (TV series)